Disguises is the fifth studio album by American rock band Aiden. Disguises was recorded some time between 2010 and 2011. Unlike previous albums, Disguises has a large usage of gang vocals. It is also their last album with founding drummer Jake Davison.

This is the only album by Aiden to not chart on Billboard Top 200, or any other chart.

So far, three singles have been released. "Walk Among the Dead", "Hysteria" (the first music video of the album), and "A Portrait of the Artist", which was released on their personal YouTube channel "Aidenvision".  The music video for "Hysteria", featuring lyrics critical of religion, shows William Francis singing in a priest's robe juxtaposed with stock footage of burning churches, religious leaders, and social unrest.  The music video for "A Portrait of the Artist" shows the other Aiden band members kidnapping Francis and ultimately hanging him and notably features drummer Ryan Seaman wearing a bandanna in place of Davison.  No video for the first single, "Walk Among the Dead" has been released.

Track listing

Personnel

Aiden
 Jake Davison – drums
 Zombie Nicholas – bass, background vocals
 Angel Ibarra – lead guitar
 Wil Francis – vocals, rhythm guitar, piano

Performers
 Austin Held – additional vocals on "ReEvolver"
 Ash Costello – additional vocals on "Shine"
 Rick Kern – additional vocals
 Jeremy Beddingfield – additional vocals
 Allana Smith – additional vocals
 Roya Nourani – additional vocals
 Daniel Matson – additional vocals
 Jamie Wheelock – additional vocals
 Nicholas McMahan – additional vocals
 Harry MacDonald – additional vocals

Design
 Chad Micheal Ward – cover photo
 Ciera Walters – band photo
 Doublej – layout design

Technical
 William Control – production, engineering, mixing
 Joel Casey Jones – engineering assistant
 Bob Bicknell – engineering assistant
 Justin Armstrong – mixing

Release history

References

External links 
 Aiden's Official Website

Victory Records albums
Aiden albums
2011 albums